Francesc de Tovi was Bishop of Urgel and ex officio Co-Prince of Andorra from 1416 to 1436.

15th-century Princes of Andorra
Bishops of Urgell
15th-century Roman Catholic bishops in the Kingdom of Aragon
Year of birth missing
Year of death missing